Khaled Mouzanar (born September 27, 1974) is a Lebanese music composer, songwriter, writer and film producer. He has composed music scores for several films, including After Shave, Caramel, Where Do We Go Now? and Capernaum (film). In 2008, he recorded Les Champs Arides, his first solo album as a singer and songwriter.  His work is rooted in various genres, including classical, contemporary and folk music. His compositions are also influenced by Brazilian choro, Argentinian tango and oriental melodies.

Career
Mouzanar studied under Boghos Gelalian – an Armenian-Lebanese composer.

In the year 2000, he established – in collaboration with Zeid Hamdan – his first label ‘Mooz Records’ through which he produced the majority of Beirut's underground music scene.  Groups such as Soap Kills and The New Government were among these productions.

One of his first professional experiences in cinema took place in 2005 with After Shave – a short film directed by Hany Tamba. The film won in France the Cesar Award for Best Short Film in 2006.

In 2007, and while signing with the French independent record company Naïve Records, Mouzanar composed the score for Caramel – a feature film directed by Nadine Labaki whom he later married.
That same year, Mouzanar recorded his first solo album (in French) entitled Les Champs Arides.  The album was co-produced with the English producer Ian Caple. It includes a duet with French singer Barbara Carlotti. The album was described by the French magazine L'Express as  "Une nouvelle promesse frissonante et racée pour la chanson française" .

In 2008, he won the UCMF (Union des compositeurs de musique de film) Award for Best Music for the soundtrack of Caramel at the Cannes Film Festival.

In 2009, he composed the music for the opening ceremony of the 2009 Jeux de la Francophonie, which was viewed by 60 million spectators all over the world.  French choreographer Daniel Charpentier directed the show.

In 2010, while writing for different artists such as Natacha Atlas, Mouzanar composed the music score for the film Where Do We Go Now? directed by Nadine Labaki, for which he won the award for Best Music at the 2011 Stockholm International Film Festival.

In 2014 he scored the soundtrack of the film Rio, I Love You (Portuguese: Rio, Eu Te Amo) and co-wrote the segment directed by Nadine Labaki.

In 2017 he produced, co-wrote the scenario and composed the music of Nadine Labaki’s feature film Capernaum (film).
The film won the Jury Prize in Cannes Films Festival 2018 , and was nominated at The Cesar Award, The Golden Globes and the Academy Awards (The Oscars) for Best Foreign Film. 

For this film Mouzanar got also nominated at the British Academy Film Awards (BAFTA).

In summer 2018, Mouzanar and his orchestra opened the prestigious Baalbeck International Festival with the score of Capernaum in the temple of Bacchus.

In 2019 Mouzanar won for the Soundtrack of Capernaum a Crystal Pine Award for Best Original Score at the International Sound & Film Music Festival (ISFMF) and was nominated for the Public Choice Award at the World Soundtrack Awards.

In 2020 Mouzanar was invited by the Academy of Motion Picture Arts and Sciences (The Oscars) to be among its distinguished members in the music branch.

That same year he co-directed with his wife Nadine Labaki the episode 11 (Mayroun and the Unicorn) of the Netflix series Homemade.

In 2022 Mouzanar scored the soundtrack of one of Netflix's great success of the year, the movie Perfect Strangers .

That same year, Mouzanar founded the festival De Vin Et De Musique in the region of Batroun. 

Mouzanar is also an activist working on the preservation of Lebanon’s heritage by preventing the demolition of traditional houses and preserving green spaces.
He is also the co-founder of the Capernaum Foundation which takes care of children with no access to education.

Discography 
2005: After Shave (2005 film) (OST) (Cesar for best Short Movie 2006)
2007: Caramel (film) (OST) (Best Music Award – UCMF in Cannes 2008)
2008: Les Champs Arides (Song-writer)
2009: Melodrama Habibi (OST)
2011: Where Do We Go Now?  (OST)  (Best Music Award 2011 – Stockholm International Film Festival)
2014: Rio, I Love You (OST) 
2018: Capernaum (film) (OST) (Best Original Score 2019 - International Sound & Film Music Festival)
2022: Perfect Strangers (OST)

Filmography 
2014: Rio, I Love You (Co-Writer of the segment "O Milagre")
2018: Capernaum (film) (Co-Writer)
2020: Homemade (co-director of the episode "Mayroun and the Unicorn")

References

External links
Naïve Records: Mouzanar
 Official facebook page
 Official twitter page

1974 births
Living people
Lebanese film score composers
21st-century Lebanese male singers
Male film score composers